Sione Taufa is an American rugby league player for the Maui Rugby Club in Hawaii. His position is wing.

Representative career 
He has represented the USA in the Atlantic Cup and also the USA 7s Rugby team

References 

American rugby league players
United States national rugby league team players
Maui Rugby players
Rugby league wingers
Living people
Year of birth missing (living people)
Place of birth missing (living people)